Åsa Larsson Blind (born 29 August 1980) is a Swedish-Sámi politician who as of March 2021 serves as vice president of the Saami Council.

Political life
She grew up in a Sámi family that cares for reindeer. She has studied at the University of Umeå and holds a master's degree in human resource management. In 2011, she was elected vice president of the council and in February 2017 was elected president. Her term as president ended in February 2021 and she was again elected vice president. In her time with the Saami Council, Larsson Blind also served from 2011 to 2015, on the board of the Arctic Council Indigenous Peoples Secretariat.

In 2019, she became the first woman elected to lead the SSR.

Personal life
She holds a master's degree in human resources management from the University of Umeå.

References

External links 
 

1980 births
Living people
Swedish Sámi politicians
Umeå University alumni
People from Västerbotten
People from Norrbotten
Swedish women activists
21st-century Swedish women politicians